The 1920–21 season was the 46th season of competitive football in England.

Overview
The Football League Third Division is introduced, expanding the League's operational radius south of Birmingham. Cardiff City, however, as the strongest club in Wales in the era, is invited directly into the Second Division, and Grimsby Town takes its place in the new Third Division, thereby being the first club relegated to the League's third tier. Leeds United is also elected into the Second Division to replace Leeds City after its debacle. Lincoln City is not re-elected to the Second Division and thus Port Vale's Second Division place is formalized as well.

Honours

† Not promoted

Notes = Number in parentheses is the times that club has won that honour. * indicates new record for competition

Football League

First Division

Second Division

Third Division

Top goalscorers

First Division
Joe Smith (Bolton Wanderers) – 38 goals

Second Division
Syd Puddefoot (West Ham United) – 29 goals

Third Division
John Conner (Crystal Palace), Ernie Simms (Luton Town) and George Whitworth (Northampton Town) – 28 goals

References